Ludwig Haetzer (also Ludwig Hetzer, Ludwig Hätzer and sometimes Ludwig Hatzer) (1500 – 4 February 1529) was an Anabaptist.

Born in Bischofszell, Thurgau, Switzerland, he wrote an article against the uses of images in worship, translated some Latin evangelical texts regarding the conversion of Jews, and, together with Hans Denck, he translated the prophets of the Bible into German in 1528. Haetzer also wrote a booklet discouraging the consumption of alcohol. He regarded Jesus as a leader and teacher only; not divine and not an object of worship, therefore an anti-trinitarian and possibly a Unitarian. 

Haetzer attended the Martyrs' Synod in Augsburg. He was executed for his Anabaptist radicalism by beheading in Konstanz, Germany, on 4 February 1529, technically for adultery.

See also

George Blaurock
Conrad Grebel
Balthasar Hubmaier
Jacob Kautz
Felix Manz
Adam Pastor

References

External links
Haetzer, Ludwig (1500-1529) at Global Anabaptist Mennonite Encyclopedia Online
Ludwig Hetzer at Britanica
Some biographical details

1500 births
1529 deaths
Antitrinitarians
People executed in the Holy Roman Empire by decapitation
Swiss Anabaptists
Executed Swiss people
16th-century Swiss people
16th-century Protestant martyrs
Translators of the Bible into German
People executed for adultery
Christian martyrs executed by decapitation
16th-century executions in the Holy Roman Empire